"Cry (Just a Little)" is a song by Dutch dance duo Bingo Players. The song's lyrics are an interpolation from "Piano in the Dark", a 1988 hit song by Brenda Russell. For this song, the line was performed by Kelli-Leigh (vocals) along with Hal Ritson (back vocals).

"Cry (Just a Little)" was released in Belgium as a digital download on 18 May 2011 and was released in the United Kingdom on 18 September 2011. The song charted in Belgium and the Netherlands.

The song was later interpolated for the chorus of Flo Rida's 2012 release, "I Cry".

Music video
A music video to accompany the release of "Cry (Just a Little)" was first released onto YouTube on 14 June 2011 onto Spinnin' TV, with a length of 3:26. The official video features Svenja van Beek, who was a singer in the Dutch girl band Djumbo. The video was shot in Marseille, France.

By unknown reasons, the music video was removed from the Spinnin' Records YouTube account in 2015–2016 only for America; meanwhile in Europe the video had remained available. At the start of 2017, Spinnin' put the video back on the YouTube platform, despite some complaints and denunciations.

Track listing

Chart performance

Weekly charts

Year-end charts

Release history

References

2011 singles
Bingo Players songs
Songs written by Scott Cutler
Songs written by Brenda Russell
All Around the World Productions singles
Big Beat Records (American record label) singles
2011 songs